Maulvi Abdul Karim is an Afghan Taliban politician who is currently serving as the Deputy Minister of Justice since 14 March 2022. Karim has alsi served as member of the negotiating team in Qatar office.

Karim belongs to Herat province. He is considered a close associate of Mullah Baradar.

References

Living people
Sharia judges
Afghan judges
Taliban government ministers of Afghanistan
People from Herat Province
Year of birth missing (living people)